Dalma Rebeka Gálfi (born 13 August 1998) is a Hungarian tennis player.

On 12 September 2022, she reached her career-high singles ranking of world No. 79. On 19 September 2022, she peaked at No. 126 in the WTA doubles rankings. Gálfi has won nine singles titles and ten doubles titles on the ITF Women's Circuit.

Personal life and background
Galfi started playing tennis when she was five years old. Her father had two tennis courts, and he taught her how to play tennis.

Junior career
Junior Grand Slam results - singles:
 Australian Open: SF (2015)
 French Open: 2R (2015)
 Wimbledon: 2R (2014)
 US Open: W (2015)

Junior Grand Slam results - doubles
 Australian Open: 2R (2015)
 French Open: QF (2015)
 Wimbledon: W (2015)
 US Open: 2R (2014)

Career highlights

2013
Gálfi was given a wildcard for the Budapest Grand Prix, where she made her WTA Tour main-draw debut alongside Lilla Barzó in doubles, only to lose to the 2011 French Open champions Andrea Hlaváčková and Lucie Hradecká.

2015: ITF Junior World Champion
In December 2015, Gálfi was pronounced ITF Junior World Champion. In that year, she won the girls' singles title at the US Open, and the girls' doubles title (with Fanny Stollár) at the Wimbledon Championships.

2021: First WTA semifinal, Grand Slam debut 
In July 2021, she reached her first WTA Tour semifinal at the Budapest Grand Prix as a wildcard.

Six years after winning the junior title at the US Open in 2015, Gálfi qualified, after eight attempts, for the first time into the main draw of a Grand Slam tournament at the US Open.

2022: Top 100
She reached the top 100 on 4 April 2022 at No. 97. After winning her first ITF grass-court title, the 2022 Ilkley Trophy in June, she reached a new career-high of world No. 81.

2023
At the 2023 Upper Austria Ladies Linz she reached the quarterfinals as a qualifier defeating seventh seed Bernarda Pera, for her first Top 50 win, and wildcard Eva Lys.

At the 2023 BNP Paribas Open in Indian Wells she qualified as a lucky loser and defeated world No. 31 Danielle Collins for her best and second career win at this level.

Performance timeline

Only main-draw results in WTA Tour, Grand Slam tournaments, Fed Cup/Billie Jean King Cup, and Olympic Games are included in win–loss records.

Singles
Current after the 2023 ATX Open.

Doubles

WTA Challenger finals

Singles: 1 (1 runner-up)

ITF finals

Singles: 15 (9 titles, 6 runner–ups)

Doubles: 23 (10 titles, 13 runner–ups)

Note: Tournaments sourced from official ITF archives

Junior Grand Slam finals

Girls' singles: 1 (title)

Girls' doubles: 2 (1 title, 1 runner–up)

National representation

Fed Cup (9–10)

Gálfi made her Fed Cup debut for Hungary in 2015, while the team was competing in the Europe/Africa Zone Group I.

Singles: 11 (4–7)

Doubles: 8 (5–3)

Note: Tournaments sourced from official Billie Jean King Cup archives

Best Grand Slam results details

Singles

Doubles

Record against top 10 players
Gálfi's record against players who have been ranked in the top 10. Only WTA Tour (including WTA 125 event) main draw counting. Active players are in boldface:

Double bagel matches

Notes

References

External links

 
 
 
 

1998 births
Living people
People from Veszprém
Hungarian female tennis players
Wimbledon junior champions
US Open (tennis) junior champions
Grand Slam (tennis) champions in girls' singles
Grand Slam (tennis) champions in girls' doubles
Sportspeople from Veszprém County
21st-century Hungarian women